Washington County is a county located in the eastern side of the U.S. state of Colorado. As of the 2020 census, the population was 4,817. The county seat is Akron. The county was named in honor of the United States President George Washington.

History
Colorado State Legislature made Washington County out of larger Weld County in 1887. In 1889, Washington County's eastern half formed Yuma County. In 1903, Arapahoe County ceded its eastern portion to Washington County to create its present form.

Like many Counties in Eastern Colorado, The Great Depression affected Washington County, bringing its population down significantly. Recently growth has been stagment.

Washington County's Eastern Colorado Roundup is home to Colorado's first home-owned carnival held on every July annually. There are activities such as rodeos, various rides, and animals to see.

Geography

Adjacent counties
Logan County - northeast
Yuma County - east
Kit Carson County - southeast
Lincoln County - southwest
Adams County - west
Arapahoe County - west
Morgan County - northwest

Major Highways
  Interstate 76

  U.S. Highway 34
  U.S. Highway 36
  State Highway 59
  State Highway 61
  State Highway 63
  State Highway 71

Trails and byways
American Discovery Trail
South Platte Trail

Demographics

At the 2000 census there were 4,926 people in 1,989 households, including 1,408 families, in the county.  The population density was 2 people per square mile (1/km2).  There were 2,307 housing units at an average density of 1 per square mile (0/km2).  The racial makeup of the county was 96.39% White, 0.04% Black or African American, 0.57% Native American, 0.10% Asian, 0.02% Pacific Islander, 2.03% from other races, and 0.85% from two or more races.  6.29% of the population were Hispanic or Latino of any race.
Of the 1,989 households 31.30% had children under the age of 18 living with them, 60.70% were married couples living together, 6.40% had a female householder with no husband present, and 29.20% were non-families. 26.20% of households were one person and 11.60% were one person aged 65 or older.  The average household size was 2.46 and the average family size was 2.97.

The age distribution was 26.50% under the age of 18, 6.30% from 18 to 24, 24.80% from 25 to 44, 24.20% from 45 to 64, and 18.20% 65 or older.  The median age was 40 years. For every 100 females there were 103.40 males.  For every 100 females age 18 and over, there were 100.10 males.

The median household income was $32,431 and the median family income was $37,287. Males had a median income of $26,225 versus $21,558 for females. The per capita income for the county was $17,788.  About 8.60% of families and 11.40% of the population were below the poverty line, including 16.30% of those under age 18 and 9.40% of those age 65 or over.

Communities

Towns
Akron
Otis

Census Designated Place 

 Cope

Unincorporated Communities

Anton
Last Chance
Lindon
Platner
Rago
Thurman
Woodrow

Ghost Towns
Messex
Pinneo

Politics
Washington is a powerfully Republican county in Presidential elections. Among Colorado counties only Washington, Elbert and Hinsdale were carried by Barry Goldwater in 1964, and no Democratic presidential nominee has carried Washington County since Franklin Delano Roosevelt in 1936. The last five Republican presidential candidates have all obtained over 75 percent of Washington County's vote.

In other statewide elections, Washington County also leans Republican, although the county was carried by Democrat Roy Romer by a narrow margin in 1990 – when he carried all but three counties statewide –  by Dick Lamm in 1982 and by Constitution Party candidate Tom Tancredo in 2010. Since 1994, no Democratic senatorial candidate has won thirty percent of Washington County's vote.

Education
There are 5 school districts in Washington County:
Akron R-1
Arickaree R-2
Lone Star 101
Otis R-3
Woodlin R-104.

Akron R-1 includes:
Akron High School

Arickaree R-2 includes:
Arickaree School (all grades K-12)

Lone Star 101 includes:
Lone Star School (all grades K-12)

Otis R-3 includes:
Otis Elementary School
Otis Jr.-Sr. High School

See also

Outline of Colorado
Index of Colorado-related articles
National Register of Historic Places listings in Washington County, Colorado

Note

References

External links

Colorado County Evolution by Don Stanwyck
Colorado Historical Society

 

 
Colorado counties
1887 establishments in Colorado
Eastern Plains
Populated places established in 1887